Simon Patrick Swordy (March 31, 1954 – July 19, 2010) was an English-born American astrophysicist.

Biography
Swordy was born in Birmingham in 1954. Both his parents were teachers. His siblings included three brothers and one sister. Swordy was educated at St Philip's School and Barstable School. He studied under Peter Fowler at the University of Bristol, and graduated in 1978. 

Swordy moved to the United States in 1979 and accepted a research associate position at the Enrico Fermi Institute. In 1986, he began teaching at the University of Chicago. Swordy became a full professor in 1997. Between 2000 and 2003, Swordy was Master of the Physical Sciences Collegiate Division and associate dean of the physical sciences. In 2001, he was elected a fellow of the American Physical Society, "[f]or innovative measurements with detectors on the ground, on balloons, and in space that significantly advanced the understanding of the sources and galactic propagation of cosmic rays at high energies." In 2007, he returned to the Enrico Fermi Institute as director. 

At the time of his death, Swordy was the James Franck Professor of Physics, Astronomy and Astrophysics at the University of Chicago. He died of lymphoma at the University of Chicago Medical Center on 19 July 2010, aged 56.

Personal life
Swordy married Josephine Ryan in 1984, with whom he raised three children.

References

Deaths from lymphoma
Deaths from cancer in Illinois
20th-century British physicists
English physicists
Fellows of the American Physical Society
21st-century British physicists
British astrophysicists
People from Birmingham, West Midlands
Alumni of the University of Bristol
University of Chicago faculty
English emigrants to the United States
20th-century American physicists
21st-century American physicists
American astrophysicists
People educated at St Philip's School